Imre Senkey (21 June 1898 – 10 October 1984) was a Hungarian football player and manager, who spent the majority of his managerial time in Italy. Senkey managed some of the top clubs in Italian football such as Roma, Torino, Fiorentina and Genoa. A defender, he made six appearances for the Hungary national team.

Honours
Torino
 Serie B: 1959–60

External links
 

1898 births
1984 deaths
Hungarian footballers
Footballers from Budapest
Association football defenders
Hungary international footballers
Hungarian football managers
MTK Budapest FC managers
ACF Fiorentina managers
A.S. Roma managers
Genoa C.F.C. managers
Brescia Calcio managers
Torino F.C. managers